Kemal Dinçer (born 2 September 1963) is a former Turkish professional basketball player. He played for the Turkey national basketball team.  He was also a member of Fenerbahçe's first Turkish Basketball League championship squad. 

Dinçer was Fenerbahçe SK's football team manager in the 2002-03 season.

Career
 1982-86 Fenerbahçe
 1988-90 Çukurova Sanayi
 1990-93 Fenerbahçe

External links
TBLStat.net Profile

References

1963 births
Living people
Turkish men's basketball players
Fenerbahçe men's basketball players
Fenerbahçe S.K. board members
Paşabahçe S.K. players